The 1926 Santa Clara Broncos football team was an American football team that represented Santa Clara University as an independent during the 1926 college football season. In their second season under head coach Adam Walsh, the Broncos compiled a 5–4 record and were outscored by opponents by a total of 147 to 101.

Schedule

References

Santa Clara
Santa Clara Broncos football seasons
Santa Clara Broncos football